Maniraptoriformes is a clade of dinosaurs with pennaceous feathers and wings that contains ornithomimosaurs and maniraptorans. This group was named by Thomas Holtz, who defined it as "the most recent common ancestor of Ornithomimus and birds, and all descendants of that common ancestor."

Fossil evidence
Many fossils have been discovered in recent years, particularly in China. Many of the feathered dinosaurs belong to this clade. In particular, a fossil of the Alvarezsauridae Shuvuuia has a version of keratin consistent with that of avian feathers.

Many nearly complete fossil maniraptoriforms are known from the late Jurassic. Archaeopteryx is known from Bavaria at 155–150 Ma. Ornitholestes, the troodontid Hesperornithoides, Coelurus fragilis and Tanycolagreus topwilsoni are all known from the Morrison Formation in Wyoming at about 150 Ma. The Daohugou biota, including Anchiornis and Epidexipteryx, is the earliest record of maniraptoriformes, dating to about 160 Ma. One possible maniraptoriform, Eshanosaurus, lived even earlier, during the Early Jurassic, though its identification is controversial.

The wide range of fossils in the early Cretaceous and morphological evidence suggests that the main branches of maniraptoriform differentiation were separate before the end of the Jurassic.

Until recently, the relatives of Tyrannosaurus were thought to be maniraptoriforms, but as of the first decade of the 21st century, this seems unlikely.

History of study
In 1994, a study by paleontologist Thomas Holtz found a close relationship between the Ornithomimosauria and Troodontidae, and named this group Bullatosauria. Holtz rejected this hypothesis in 1999, and most paleontologists now consider troodontids to be much more closely related to either birds or Dromaeosauridae than they are to ornithomimosaurs, causing the Bullatosauria to be abandoned. The name referred to the inflated (bulbous) sphenoid both groups shared. Holtz defined the group as  the clade containing the most recent common ancestor of Troodon and Ornithomimus and all its descendants. The concept is now considered redundant, and the clade Bullatosauria is now viewed as synonymous with Maniraptoriformes. In 2002, Gregory S. Paul named an apomorphy-based clade Avepectora, defined to include all theropods with a bird-like arrangement of the pectoral bones, where the angled shoulder girdle (coracoids) come in contact with the breastbone (sternum). According to Paul, ornithomimosaurs are the most basal members of this group. In 2010, Paul used Avepectora for a smaller clade, excluding ornithomimosaurs, compsognathids and alvarezsauroids.

Classification
The relationships among coelurosaurs shown below were found in a phylogenetic analysis by Godefroit and colleagues in 2013.

See also

 Coelurosauria
 Maniraptora

References

 
Extant Late Jurassic first appearances
Oxfordian first appearances